Rainbow Crafts, Inc. (traded as Rainbow Crafts) is  a former toy manufacturing company created and operated by Noah McVicker and his nephew Joseph McVicker as a subsidiary of the midwestern soap company, Kutol Products. The company manufactured Play-Doh, a modeling compound for children. Rainbow Crafts operated under the McVickers from 1956 until 1965 when it was sold to General Mills with all rights to Play-Doh. In 1971, Rainbow Crafts and Kenner merged.

Hasbro currently manufactures Play-Doh today.

References

Toy companies of the United States